Michael F. Galloway (May 8, 1925 – October 12, 2010) was an American actor with more than three hundred and fifty film, television and theater credits throughout his career. He was perhaps best known for his role in the early 1960s television series, The Blue Angels.

Galloway was born in Boise, Idaho, on May 8, 1925. His father was a lawyer and he was the youngest of four brothers. Galloway enlisted in the United States Air Force during World War II. He enrolled at both the University of Idaho and the University of Southern California on basketball scholarships following the end of the war. Galloway began to pursue acting following a car accident which ended his athletic career.

Galloway died on October 12, 2010, in Los Angeles, California, at the age of 85.

Filmography
With a Song in My Heart (film) 1952 (uncredited)
Suspense (American TV series) 1952
Battle Circus (film) 1953 (uncredited)
Medic (TV series) 1956
Telephone Time 1956
Dick Powell's Zane Grey Theater 1957
Dragnet (1951 TV series) 1957
The 20th Century Fox Hour 1957
House of Numbers (1957 film) (uncredited)
Broken Arrow (TV series) 1958
Steve Canyon 1958
In Love and War (1958 film) (uncredited)
Maverick (TV series) 1959
Frontier Doctor 1959
The Texan (TV series) 1959
Men into Space 1959
The Blue Angels (TV series) 1960-61
A Ticklish Affair 1963 (uncredited)
Gordon's War 1973
Tales of the Unexpected (TV series) 1984

References

External links

1925 births
2010 deaths
American male television actors
American male film actors
American male stage actors
United States Army Air Forces personnel of World War II
University of Southern California alumni
People from Boise, Idaho
Male actors from Idaho
20th-century American male actors